Ciconia louisebolesae  is an extinct species of stork from the Early Miocene of Australia. It was described by Walter Boles from fossil material found in a cave deposit at the Bitesantennary Site of Riversleigh, in the Boodjamulla National Park of north-western Queensland. The specific epithet refers to Louise Boles, the describer's mother, to whom the description is dedicated.

References

Fossil taxa described in 2005
Ciconia
Miocene birds
Miocene birds of Australia
Riversleigh fauna
Birds described in 2005